Elections to Metropolitan Borough of Bermondsey were held in 1949.

The borough had 12 wards which returned between 3 and 6 members. Of the 12 wards 2 of the wards had all candidates elected unopposed. Labour won all the seats except one ward. The Conservatives standing as Municipal Reform won one ward.

Election result

|}

References

Council elections in the London Borough of Southwark
1945 in London
1945 English local elections
Bermondsey